London Film School (LFS) is a film school in London and is situated in a converted brewery in Covent Garden, London, neighbouring Soho, a hub of the UK film industry. It is the oldest film school in the UK.

LFS was founded in 1956 by Gilmore Roberts as the London School of Film Technique (LSFT). Originally based on Electric Avenue in Brixton, the school moved to its current premises on Shelton Street in 1966, after a brief parenthesis in Charlotte Street, and changed its name to London Film School in 1969. From 1974 to 2000, it was known as the London International Film School (LIFS), and reverted to the name London Film School in 2001.

LFS offers various degrees at postgraduate level: an MA in Filmmaking, an MA in Screenwriting, and, in partnership with the University of Exeter, an MA in International Film Business and a PhD in Film by Practice. It also offers a range of short and part-time professional development courses under the LFS Workshops banner.

LFS recruits students from all over the world and is specifically constituted as an international community; around 70% of its students are from outside the United Kingdom. LFS is recognised as a World-Leading Specialist Provider by the Office for Students and in recent years it has been named one of the top international film schools by Variety and The Hollywood Reporter.

The school's current director is Neil Peplow and chairman is Greg Dyke.

History
The origin of the LFS was a short film training course taught by Gilmore Roberts at the Heatherley School of Fine Art in Chelsea. After a dispute with the art school, Roberts decided to continue the course independently, so he set up the London School of Film Technique in October 1956. After struggling to find suitable premises, the first filmmaking course finally started in April 1957, based in rather modest locales above a grocer's shop in Electric Avenue, Brixton.

The school was the first of its kind in the United Kingdom. Inspired by the emergence of film schools in Eastern Europe after World War II, it was set up around the belief that the future of the British film industry required properly designed formal training, rather than the apprenticeship basis which was, at the time, the only access into the field. At first, the school offered a 6-months diploma course which students could take over the day or evening classes, with an optional 6-months extension. Under the leadership of a new principal, Robert Dunbar, the course was expanded to 33 weeks and later 2 years, forming the basic structure for a curriculum that is still largely in place today.

This caused a drastic increase in the student numbers, which made the original premises unsuited. The school moved to the West End in 1963, first into a building in Charlotte Street and later, in 1966, in its current premises on Shelton Street. In 1969 it changed name to London Film School, to avoid being regarded as an institution that only offered narrow technical training. Notable alumni from the 1960s include directors such as Mike Leigh, Michael Mann, Don Boyd, and Les Blair, cinematographers such as Tak Fujimoto and Roger Pratt, as well as producers like Iain Smith.

In the early 1970s, a decrease of student numbers caused by various factors, including the establishment of the National Film School and the global impact of the oil crisis, brought the school into a financial crisis and eventually into liquidation. Staff and students banded together to press for continuation of the school; thanks to their efforts in raising the necessary funds, the school reopened in 1975, at the same location, under a new name: the London International Film School.

The school was newly incorporated as a charity, nonprofit-making company limited by guarantee. All students automatically became members of the company upon enrolment, with the right to elect, together with the other members, a board of governors who have the overall responsibility for the management of the school. Manny Wynn was appointed principal of the re-established LIFS until his sudden death six months later, when he was succeeded by John Fletcher.

Notable filmmakers from all over the world studied at the LIFS in the 1970s and 1980s, including Mexican director Luis Mandoki, Hong Kong director Ann Hui, Swiss cinematographer Ueli Steiger and Argentinian director Miguel Pereira. After John Fletcher's death, Martin Amstel was appointed principal in 1986. Ten years later, in 1996, the 40th anniversary of the school was celebrated with events and screening of graduates’ work in London, Los Angeles and Mexico City.

After the appointment of Ben Gibson as principal in 2000, the school returned to be known as London Film School. Under Ben Gibson, LFS transitioned from offering a diploma course to offering postgraduate MA programmes, first validated by the London Metropolitan University and later by University of Warwick. Nevertheless, the curriculum of the filmmaking course remained very similar and maintained its focus on practical filmmaking. Adjustments where brought in place to reflect the technological developments in the film industry and the transition to digital. The school also started diversifying its courses: next to its traditional course in filmmaking, it started offering an MA course in screenwriting in 2005 and, from 2014, an MA in International Film Business in partnership with the University of Exeter.

Ben Gibson was succeeded as the director of the school by Jane Roscoe, who briefly held the post from 2014 to 2017. Gísli Snær, Head of Studies at LFS since 2016, was appointed as the new director in 2018; Snær presided over the school during the difficult years of the COVID-19 pandemic, until stepping down in June 2022. After six months under interim director Peter Holliday, Neil Peplow was appointed as the new director in January 2023.

In recent years, films made at the school have regularly featured and won awards in some of the world's top film festivals, including Venice, Cannes, Berlin, the BFI London Film Festival, Encounters and Sundance. Recent alumni include Benjamin Cleary, Anu Menon, Koby Adom Carla Simón.

Facilities 
The main London Film School building in Shelton Street was previously a brewery and a banana warehouse. Additional facilities are present in an annex building in Long Acre.

Facilities at LFS include two studios (Stage B and Stage D) equipped with lighting grids, as well as a rehearsal studio used also for workshops. LFS occasionally hires external studios facilities as well.

The school has a fully equipped design studio with drawing boards, model making facilities, visual reference library, materials library and design computer suite. It has editing suites equipped with Avid Media Composer as well as sound suites equipped with Pro Tools 24HD, a commentary and foley recording area and a sound effects library.

LFS also has two cinemas (Cinema A & B), with 110 and 35 seat capacity respectively and projection facilities for both digital and 35mm.

London Film School is planning to relocate to new facilities nearby in Covent Garden over the course of the 2023/24 academic year.

Courses of studies
The London Film School is built around a conservatoire model. Filmmaking is taught on stages and in workshops rather than in classrooms, and the courses are structured around practical work. The school has a full-time faculty and a varied group of regular visiting lecturers.

The MA Filmmaking programme has no pre-specialisation. Over the two-year course, all students are provided with a full education in all the craft areas of filmmaking: directing, producing, editing, cinematography, sound, production design, and writing. Students work on at least one film every term, in different roles, and have the chance to crew on films made by students from other terms. Exercises include films shot in 16mm on location with no sound or only post-recorded sound and films shot on 35mm or digital in studio, on purposely designed and built sets. One term is dedicated to making a documentary. For their graduation films, students do not have limitations and are allowed to shoot on any format and at any length they can budget and schedule. Often, students make their graduation film in their home country, which means that LFS films have been made all over the world. All film exercises are provided with a production allowance included in the fees. With around 200 full-time students at any one time on the programme, it generates over 180 films a year.

The one-year MA Screenwriting programme is centred on the development of a full-length feature script, with individual monitoring and guidance from industry mentors. Workshops on storytelling and film language, characterisation, scene writing, and more are based around practical writing exercises. Screenwriting students have the chance to collaborate with students on the filmmaking programme and experience the production side of filmmaking first hand.

The MA International Film Business programme, run in conjunction with the University of Exeter, prepares students for careers in programming, exhibition and distribution. Over the one-year course, students participate in modules in international finance, world cinema and a trip to the Berlin Film Festival.

The MA Filmmaking and MA Screenwriting programmes are validated by the University of Warwick, while the MA International Film Business is offered jointly with the University of Exeter. Next to the full-time MA courses, the London Film School offers a variety of short term workshops and professional development courses, as well as a PhD programme in Film by Practice in partnership with the University of Exeter.

Governance and Staff

Director
Neil Peplow

Governing Body
Chair: Greg Dyke
Vice-Chair: Amanda Nevill CBE
Governors:
Kemal Akhtar
Olivier Kaempfer
Peter Holliday
Nick Humby
Cindy Rampersaud
Joan Watson
Suzy Black
William Macpherson
Sophia Wellington, LFS Staff Governor
Gregory Randolph, LFS Student Governor

Key Academic Staff
Femi Kolade – Head of Studies
Candida Moriarty – Head of Production Design
Wojciech Wrzesniewski – Head of Sound
Peter Hollywood – Head of Editing
Sophia Wellington – Head of Screenwriting and MA Screenwriting Course Leader
Victoria Thomas - MA International Film Business Course Leader
Tiana Harper – MA Filmmaking Course Leader
Rafael Kapelinski – Term 1 Tutor and Module 1 Leader
Jonas Grimås - Term 2 Tutor
Nicola Gibson – Term 3 Tutor and Module 2 Leader
Giles Borg – Term 5 Tutor
Sue Austen – Term 6 Tutor and Module 3 Leader
Richard Kwietniowski – Term 6 Tutor and Module 3 Leader

LFS alumni

The school's alumni include:

Gavin MacFadyen
John Irvin 
Ian Wilson BSC
Ross Devenish
Bill Douglas
Tak Fujimoto ASC
Boaz Davidson
Mark Forstater
Harley Cokeliss
Mohamed Khan
Mike Leigh
Les Blair
Michael Mann
Franc Roddam
Eduardo Guedes
George P. Cosmatos
Jins Shamsuddin
Don Boyd
Roger Pratt BSC
Nii Kwate Owoo
Iain Smith
Gale Tattersall
Iain Sinclair
Horace Ove
Manousos Manousakis
Mark Goldblatt
Alessandro Di Robilant
Tunde Kelani
Luis Mandoki
Menelik Shabazz
Miguel Pereira
Dominique Othenin-Girard
Alessandro Jacchia
Ueli Steiger ASC
Yorgos Mavropsaridis
Ann Hui
Robert Leighton
Danny Huston
Shimako Sato
Brad Anderson
Affonso Gonçalves
Kamran Qureshi
John Walsh
Elliot Hegarty
Newton Aduaka
Duncan Jones
Ishaya Bako
Babak Jalali
Ginevra Elkann
Camilla Stroem Henriksen
Anu Menon
Anjali Menon
Ali F. Mostafa
Charlotte Colbert
Simón Mesa Soto
Benjamin Cleary
Carla Simón

Honorary Associates
Every year, at London Film School's Annual Showcase, the school awards an Honorary Associateship to commended leading screen industry figures. Previous recipients of this award are:

Gillian Anderson
Amma Asante
Jim Broadbent
Mike Figgis
Stephen Frears
Abbas Kiarostami
Ken Loach
Pawel Pawlikowski
Lynne Ramsay
Jeremy Thomas
Richard Linklater
Philip Davis
Ralph Fiennes
Philip French
William Friedkin
Jack Gold
Christine Langan
Richard Lester
Samantha Morton
Tessa Ross
Rita Tushingham
Walter Murch
Asif Kapadia
Les Blair
Gurinder Chadha
Alan Parker
Kasi Lemmons
Marianne Jean-Baptiste
Clint Dyer
Sarah Niles

References

External links
Official website
London Film School 50th Anniversary Website
Alice Jones, "Preview: 50 Years of the London Film School, National Film Theatre, London", The Independent, 28 May 2006.
"More than just a way into the reel thing", Times Higher Education, 23 June 2006.
Nick Roddick, "The London Film School conquers the world",  London Evening Standard, 24 July 2009.
Hollywood Reporter Top International Film Schools 2021, 

Film schools in England
Educational institutions established in 1956
1956 establishments in England
Grade II listed buildings in the City of Westminster